The arrondissement of Segré is an arrondissement of France in the Maine-et-Loire department in the Pays de la Loire region. It has 27 communes.

Composition

The communes of the arrondissement of Segré, and their INSEE codes, are:
 
 Angrie (49008)
 Armaillé (49010)
 Bécon-les-Granits (49026)
 Bouillé-Ménard (49036)
 Bourg-l'Évêque (49038)
 Candé (49054)
 Carbay (49056)
 Challain-la-Potherie (49061)
 Chambellay (49064)
 Chazé-sur-Argos (49089)
 Chenillé-Champteussé (49067)
 Erdre-en-Anjou (49367)
 Grez-Neuville (49155)
 Les Hauts-d'Anjou (49080)
 La Jaille-Yvon (49161)
 Juvardeil (49170)
 Le Lion-d'Angers (49176)
 Loiré (49178)
 Miré (49205)
 Montreuil-sur-Maine (49217)
 Ombrée d'Anjou (49248)
 Saint-Augustin-des-Bois (49266)
 Saint-Sigismond (49321)
 Sceaux-d'Anjou (49330)
 Segré-en-Anjou Bleu (49331)
 Thorigné-d'Anjou (49344)
 Val d'Erdre-Auxence (49183)

History

The arrondissement of Segré was created in 1800. At the January 2017 reorganisation of the arrondissements of Maine-et-Loire, it gained four communes from the arrondissement of Angers.

As a result of the reorganisation of the cantons of France which came into effect in 2015, the borders of the cantons are no longer related to the borders of the arrondissements. The cantons of the arrondissement of Segré were, as of January 2015:
 Candé
 Châteauneuf-sur-Sarthe
 Le Lion-d'Angers
 Pouancé
 Segré

References

Segre